Osman Tarık Çamdal (born 24 March 1991) is a Turkish professional footballer who plays as a full-back for Göztepe.

International career
Çamdal made his debut for Turkey against the Republic of Ireland at the Aviva Stadium in Dublin. He scored the winning goal in a 2–1 victory; Turkey's first victory over Ireland on Irish soil.

Personal life
He married Swedish national midfielder Erkan Zengin's sister on 30 December 2015 in Södertälje, Sweden.

References

External links
 
 
 
 

1991 births
Footballers from Munich
German people of Turkish descent
Living people
German footballers
Germany youth international footballers
Turkish footballers
Turkey B international footballers
Turkey international footballers
Association football midfielders
TSV 1860 Munich players
TSV 1860 Munich II players
Eskişehirspor footballers
Galatasaray S.K. footballers
Antalyaspor footballers
Adana Demirspor footballers
Tuzlaspor players
Göztepe S.K. footballers
2. Bundesliga players
Regionalliga players
Süper Lig players
TFF First League players